Ahliman Tapdiq oğlu Amiraslanov (born 1947) is an oncologist, a professor and Rector of Azerbaijan Medical University.

Personal life 
He was born 1947 in the village Zod in the Basargechar raion of the Armenian SSR. In 1970, he graduated from the Azerbaijan Medical Institute in Baku, Azerbaijan. In 1977, he defended his doctoral thesis in the Soviet Academy for Medical Sciences, Moscow. He has been Rector of the Azerbaijan Medical University since 1992.

He is co-chairman of the Rectors' Council of the Universities of Turkic Countries. He was member of the parliament (Supreme Soviet) of the Republic of Azerbaijan in 1990–1995.

Main scientific achievements and awards 
 1985 — Academician Petrov's award of the Academy of Medical Sciences of USSR;
 1986 — USSR State Prize
 1991 — A Meritorious Scientist of the Azerbaijan Republic;
 1999 — Laureate of A.Schweizer Golden Medal of Poland Academy of Medical Sciences;
 2000 — Recipient of the Shohrat Order

Membership with international and foreign scientific organizations 
Member of International Association of Orthopedists, Traumatologists and Oncologists;
Member of European Association of Reconstructive Surgery;
Member of Grecian, Hungarian, Czechoslovakian Society of Oncologists;
Member of American Society of Clinical Oncology;
Active member of Russian Academy of Medical Sciences;
Active member of Poland Academy of Medical Sciences;
Active member of Russian Academy of Natural Sciences;
Active member of Azerbaijan National Academy of Sciences;

References

External links

 
 

1947 births
Living people
Armenian Azerbaijanis
Azerbaijani oncologists
Academic staff of Azerbaijan Medical University
Azerbaijani inventors
Azerbaijan Medical University alumni
Recipients of the Shohrat Order
People from Gegharkunik Province
Foreign Members of the Russian Academy of Sciences
Soviet oncologists